Orville William "Rolly" Roulston (April 12, 1911 – April 24, 1983) was a Canadian professional ice hockey defenceman who played 24 games in the National Hockey League for the Detroit Red Wings in three separate seasons between 1936 and 1938. Roulston missed most of the 1936-37 season due to an injury, but his name was still engraved on the Stanley Cup as a member of the champion Detroit Red Wings. The rest of his career, which lasted from 1930 to 1942, was spent in various minor leagues. He was born in Toronto, Ontario.

Career statistics

Regular season and playoffs

External links
 

1911 births
1983 deaths
Canadian expatriate ice hockey players in the United States
Canadian ice hockey defencemen
Cleveland Indians (IHL) players
Detroit Olympics (IHL) players
Detroit Red Wings players
Hershey Bears players
Philadelphia Ramblers players
Pittsburgh Hornets players
Portland Buckaroos players
Ice hockey people from Toronto
Stanley Cup champions
Tulsa Oilers (AHA) players
Wichita Vikings players
Windsor Bulldogs (1929–1936) players